Sylvester Norris (born February 18, 1957) is an American former professional basketball player. He played in the National Basketball Association (NBA) for the San Antonio Spurs in 17 games during the 1979–80 season. He averaged 2.4 points and 2.5 rebounds per game.

He is the older brother of Audie Norris, who also played in the NBA for the Portland Trail Blazers.

References

1957 births
Living people
American expatriate basketball people in Italy
American men's basketball players
Basketball players from Jackson, Mississippi
Centers (basketball)
Jackson State Tigers basketball players
San Antonio Spurs draft picks
San Antonio Spurs players